The 2009 Giro dell'Emilia was the 92nd edition of this single day road bicycle racing.

Results

Giro Dellemillia, 2009
Giro dell'Emillia
Giro dell'Emilia